The Ministry of Interior Republic of Somaliland) "(MoL)" (Arabic: وزارة الداخلية)  is a Somaliland government ministry, tasked and primarily responsible for  the internal policies, state security, administration of internal affairs involving the state, the current minister is Mohamed Kahin Ahmed

Responsibilities
Here are some of the main responsibilities of the ministry :- 

 Providing citizenship and permanent resident status.
 Issuing of entry visas and staying visas in the country.
 Inhabitants administration: personal registration.
 Protecting entryways into the country such as sea, air and land.
 Issuing export and import licenses.
 Possession of firearms and explosives.
 Identity of refugees and asylum seekers.
 Maintaining citizen's safety and public discipline

Departments
This ministry has six official departments

Ministers of Interior

References

11. ^ "https://www.somalilandsun.com/somaliland-kulmiye-party-wins-presidential-elections/. Retrieved 21 November 2017.

External links
 Somaliland Interior Ministry

Politics of Somaliland
Government ministries of Somaliland